is a Japanese gunka. It was composed by Sakunosuke Koyama in 1891, and its lyrics were written by Yamada Bimyō in 1886.  The melody, which is in ternary form, uses a major pentatonic scale.

Lyrics

References 

1886 songs
1891 compositions
Japanese-language songs
Japanese patriotic songs